The 2023 Bangladesh Premier League, also known as BPL 9 or Ispahani BPL 2023 Powered by Minister Group (for sponsorship reasons) was the ninth season of the Bangladesh Premier League (BPL), the top-level professional Twenty20 cricket league in Bangladesh, organized by the Bangladesh Cricket Board (BCB). In July 2022, after the International Cricket Council accommodated the month of January and February for this league in its Future Tours Programme, the BCB announced the schedule of the BPL for the next three seasons. Accordingly, the ninth season was scheduled to be held from 5 January to 16 February in 2023. BCB also decided to increase the number of teams to 7 and to sell the franchise rights for 3 years from this season.

BCB announced the list of franchise owners in September 2022, with five of the previous six franchises retaining ownership and the return of Rangpur Riders after two seasons.
On 24 December 2022, BCB announced the fixtures for this season with two matches to be played per day in the group stage and having reserve days for all of the knockout matches.

In the final, Comilla Victorians defeated Sylhet Strikers by 7 wickets to win their second successive and overall fourth title.

Draft and squads 

Before the draft Fortune Barishal signed up 10 players through direct recruitment, the most by any team. Unmukt Chand, former Indian cricketer also registered for the draft, being the only Indian so far to have registered in BPL's players' draft. Before the draft, each team was allowed to recruit directly only one domestic player and unlimited number of foreign players.

The players' draft was held on 23rd November 2022.

Each team are allowed to pick up a minimum of 12 players from the draft, at least ten local players and two foreign players. But there is no maximum limit of picking up foreign players from the draft.

Venues

Teams and standings

Points Table 

  Advanced to the Qualifier 1
  Advanced to the Eliminator

League progression

League stage

Phase 1 (Dhaka)

Phase 2 (Chittagong)

Phase 3 (Dhaka)

Phase 4 (Sylhet)

Phase 5 (Dhaka)

Playoffs

Eliminator

Qualifiers
Qualifier 1

Qualifier 2

Final

Statistics

Most runs

Most wickets

Highest team totals

Prizes and Awards
The following prizes were given after the final match.

References

External links
 League home at ESPNCricinfo

Bangladesh Premier League seasons
2023 in Bangladeshi cricket